Live at the Us Festival is a live album and DVD by Canadian rock band Triumph, released in 2003. The massive Us Festival took place over three days, outdoors in San Bernardino, California, on May 28–30, 1983. Triumph appeared on May 29, which was billed as "Heavy Metal Sunday" and included Ozzy Osbourne, Judas Priest, Scorpions, Mötley Crüe, Quiet Riot, and Van Halen. The number of attendees varied during the three days; the crowd was estimated to be about 500,000 strong on "Heavy Metal Sunday". The documentary-style part of the DVD gives a behind-the-scenes look at how their shows are put together; lighting, pyrotechnics, smoke, and lightning techniques are explained. Rik Emmett explains their songwriting process in his home. They interview celebrities like Ronnie James Dio that are at the show. Two videos are included, "Spellbound", and "Follow Your Heart", which showcases a live performance, all in DTS Surround Sound. Gil Moore and Mike Levine reminisce about the performance in a fifteen-minute interview from 2003.

Set list
 "Too Much Thinking" (Gil Moore, Michael Levine, Rik Emmett) – 5:26
 "Allied Forces" (Gil Moore, Michael Levine, Rik Emmett) – 3:41
 "Lay it on the Line" (Rik Emmett) – 4:30
 "Never Surrender" (Rik Emmett, Michael Levine, Gil Moore) – 6:37
 "Magic Power" (Rik Emmett, Michael Levine, Gil Moore) – 5:49
 "A World of Fantasy" (Rik Emmett, Michael Levine, Gil Moore, Tim Patrick) – 5:32
 "Rock & Roll Machine" (Gil Moore) – 10:31
 "When the Lights Go Down" (Gil Moore, Michael Levine, Rik Emmett) – 6:18
 "Fight the Good Fight" (Rik Emmett, Michael Levine, Gil Moore) – 8:07

CD Version
 "Allied Forces" (Gil Moore, Michael Levine, Rik Emmett) – 3:41
 "Lay it on the Line" (Rik Emmett) – 4:30
 "Never Surrender" (Rik Emmett, Michael Levine, Gil Moore) – 6:37
 "Magic Power" (Rik Emmett, Michael Levine, Gil Moore) – 5:49
 "A World of Fantasy" (Rik Emmett, Michael Levine, Gil Moore, Tim Patrick) – 5:32
 "Rock & Roll Machine" (Gil Moore) – 10:31
 "When the Lights Go Down" (Gil Moore, Michael Levine, Rik Emmett) – 6:18
 "Fight the Good Fight" (Rik Emmett, Michael Levine, Gil Moore) – 8:07

Bonus Track
 "Follow Your Heart" (Gil Moore, Michael Levine, Rik Emmett) – 4:06

DVD Version
 "Allied Forces" (Gil Moore, Michael Levine, Rik Emmett) – 3:41
 "Lay it on the Line" (Rik Emmett) – 4:30
 "Never Surrender" (Rik Emmett, Michael Levine, Gil Moore) – 6:37
 "Magic Power" (Rik Emmett, Michael Levine, Gil Moore) – 5:49
 "A World of Fantasy" (Rik Emmett, Michael Levine, Gil Moore, Tim Patrick) – 5:32
 "Rock & Roll Machine" (Gil Moore) – 10:31
 "When the Lights Go Down" (Gil Moore, Michael Levine, Rik Emmett) – 6:18
 "Fight the Good Fight" (Rik Emmett, Michael Levine, Gil Moore) – 8:07

DVD Bonus Features
 2003 interview with Mike Levine & Gil Moore
 Bonus Videos: "Spellbound" and "Follow Your Heart"
 Inside the Rock and Roll Machine – A forty-minute rockumentary highlighting the explosive Triumph arena rock show.

Personnel
 Rik Emmett – guitar, vocals
 Gil Moore – drums, percussion, vocals, executive producer
 Michael Levine – bass guitar, keyboards, synthesizer and Vocoder

Production
 Gil Moore – executive producer
 Brett Zilahi – mastering
 Joel Kazmi – assistant
 Steve Wozniak – concept
 Joe Aceti – concert director
 Richard Chycki – mixing

Details

DTS 5.1 Surround
Dolby Digital 5.1 Surround
Dolby Digital 2.0 Stereo
Colour
Digitally processed
DTS Sound
1.33:1 – Full frame

External links
 US Festivals website
 US Festival Entry At Triumph Official Homepage

Triumph (band) albums
Albums produced by Mike Levine (musician)
2003 live albums